Janus Lauritz Andreas Kolderup Rosenvinge, generally cited as Lauritz Kolderup Rosenvinge (7 November 1858 – 1939) was a Danish botanist and phycologist. 

Kolderup Rosenvinge received his Ph.D. in 1888 from the University of Copenhagen. He was docent of botany at the polytechnic (Polyteknisk Læreanstalt) from 1900; and professor of botany at the University of Copenhagen from 1916, focusing on spore plants . He undertook investigations of algae in Danish waters and in the North Atlantic.

2 types of alga genus Rosenvingea  and Rosenvingiella , which is a genus of green algae in the family Prasiolaceae, have been named in his honour.

References

External link

Danish phycologists
Botanists with author abbreviations
Botanists active in the Arctic
20th-century Danish botanists
Danish marine biologists
Danish scientists
Academic staff of the University of Copenhagen
University of Copenhagen alumni
Rosenvinge family
1858 births
1939 deaths
19th-century Danish botanists